The 2014 Southland Conference women's basketball tournament, a part of the 2013–14 NCAA Division I women's basketball season, took place March 13–16, 2014 at the Merrell Center in Katy, Texas. The winner of the tournament, the Northwestern State Lady Demons, received the Southland Conference's automatic bid to the 2014 NCAA tournament.

Seeds & Regular Season Standings
Only the Top 8 teams advanced to the Southland Conference tournament.  If a team ineligible for the NCAA Tourney finished in the top 8, their seed fell to the next eligible team. Abilene Christian and Incarnate Word were ineligible for post-season play as they were in the first year of a 4-year transition from Division II to Division I. They won't be eligible for the Southland tourney until 2018. New Orleans was ineligible due to low APR scores. This chart shows all the teams records and standings and explains why teams advanced to the conference tourney or finished in certain tiebreaking positions. This was the final season Oral Roberts was part of the Southland field. They returned to the Summit League for the 2014-15 athletic season.

Bracket

See also
2014 Southland Conference men's basketball tournament
Southland Conference women's basketball tournament

References

Southland Conference women's basketball tournament
2013–14 Southland Conference women's basketball season
Southland Conference basketball
Southland Conference women's basketball tournament